Graeme Reichman (4 November 1951 – 11 November 2001) was an Australian rules footballer who played with Collingwood in the Victorian Football League (VFL).

After winning a Maskell Medal with Mortlake as the 'best and fairest' player in the 1971 Hampden Football League season, Reichman was signed up by Collingwood and played VFL reserves in 1972.

VFL career

He made his senior debut in the 1973 season and appeared in the first ten games of the year, as a 21-year-old. Only once did he finish in a losing side and Collingwood went on to claim the minor premiership, however Reichman missed the latter half of the season through injury and returned to Mortlake.

Country football
Reichman won another Maskell Medal in 1976 and in the early 1980s played with the Hamilton Imperials in the Western Border Football League. He was a member of Hamilton's 1980 premiership team and won the league's 'best and fairest' award in 1982.

Reichman was still playing football while he was into his late forties. He was a football nomad that played for various clubs  within the Western district of Victoria.

Death
In 2001, a week after his 50th birthday, Reichman committed suicide at his home in West Warrnambool. The body of his 25 year old wife Emma was also found in the house and firearms were confiscated by police.

References

1951 births
Australian rules footballers from Victoria (Australia)
Collingwood Football Club players
Mortlake Football Club players
Hamilton Imperials Football Club players
Suicides in Victoria (Australia)
Suicides by firearm in Australia
Murder–suicides in Australia
2001 deaths
2001 suicides
2000s in Victoria (Australia)
2001 murders in Australia